The Regional Centre for Education in Science and Mathematics (RECSAM) is a multinational educational corporation headquartered in Penang, Malaysia. It is one of the founding sister centres of the Southeast Asian Ministers of Education Organisation (SEAMEO), established on 30 November 1965 to promote co-operation in education, science and culture in the Southeast Asian region.

Since its inception in 1967, RECSAM has assisted in the training of educators in science and mathematics at the primary and secondary school levels in Brunei Darussalam, Cambodia, Indonesia, Laos, Malaysia, Myanmar, the Philippines, Singapore, Thailand, Timor Leste and Vietnam.

References

External links
 Official website

Penang
Penang